The FIFA Women's World Cup (WWC) was first broadcast on television in time for the very first tournament in 1991 and now ranks in the top five for most watched sporting broadcasts in the world. Below is a list of the stations/companies that air the WWC for their respective countries. This page was created in 2015 and contains the information for the 2011 & 2015 tournaments and onward, except in cases where previous information on broadcasters can be found.

Africa

Algeria
2023– beIN Media Group
2019– beIN Media Group
2015– beIN Media Group
2011– Al Jazeera Sports & Eurosport

Angola
2023– TPA
2011– African Union of Broadcasting & SuperSport

Benin
2011– African Union of Broadcasting & SuperSport

Botswana
2011– African Union of Broadcasting & SuperSport

Burkina Faso
2011– African Union of Broadcasting & SuperSport

Burundi
2011– African Union of Broadcasting & SuperSport

Cameroon
2023– CRTV
2011– African Union of Broadcasting & SuperSport

Cape Verde
2011– African Union of Broadcasting & SuperSport

Central African Republic
2011– African Union of Broadcasting & SuperSport

Chad
2011– African Union of Broadcasting & SuperSport

Comoros
2019– beIN Media Group
2015– beIN Media Group
2011– Al Jazeera Sport

Congo Brazzaville
2011– African Union of Broadcasting & SuperSport

Cote D'Ivoire
2011– African Union of Broadcasting & SuperSport

Democratic Republic of Congo
2011– African Union of Broadcasting & SuperSport

Djibouti
2023– beIN Media Group
2019– beIN Media Group
2015– beIN Media Group
2011– Al Jazeera Sport

Ecuatorial Guinea
2011– African Union of Broadcasting & SuperSport

Egypt
2023– beIN Media Group
2019– beIN Media Group
2015– beIN Media Group
2011– Al Jazeera Sport & Eurosport

Eritrea
2011– African Union of Broadcasting & SuperSport

Ethiopia
2011– African Union of Broadcasting & SuperSport

Gabon
2011– African Union of Broadcasting & SuperSport

Gambia
2023– GRTS
2011– African Union of Broadcasting & SuperSport

Ghana
2023– GBC
2011– African Union of Broadcasting & SuperSport

Guinea Bissau
2011– African Union of Broadcasting & SuperSport

Guinea Conakry
2011– African Union of Broadcasting & SuperSport

Kenya
2023– Kenya Broadcasting Corporation
2015– StarTimes Sports
2011– African Union of Broadcasting & SuperSport

Lesotho
2011– African Union of Broadcasting & SuperSport

Liberia
2011– African Union of Broadcasting & SuperSport

Libya
2019– beIN Media Group
2015– beIN Media Group
2011– Al Jazeera Sport & Eurosport

Madagascar
2011– African Union of Broadcasting & SuperSport

Malawi
2023– MBC
2019– SuperSport
2011– African Union of Broadcasting & SuperSport

Mali
2011– African Union of Broadcasting & SuperSport

Mauritania
2019– beIN Media Group
2015– beIN Media Group
2011– Al Jazeera Sport

Mauritius
2011– African Union of Broadcasting & SuperSport

Morocco
2023– beIN Media Group & SNRT
2019– beIN Media Group
2015– beIN Media Group
2011– Al Jazeera Sport & Eurosport

Mozambique
2011– African Union of Broadcasting & SuperSport

Namibia
2011– African Union of Broadcasting & SuperSport

Niger
2023– ORTN
2011– African Union of Broadcasting & SuperSport

Nigeria
2023– SuperSport
2011– African Union of Broadcasting & SuperSport

Rwanda
2011– African Union of Broadcasting & SuperSport

Reunion
2019– Canal+

Senegal
2011– African Union of Broadcasting & SuperSport

Seychelles
2011– African Union of Broadcasting & SuperSport

Sierra Leone
2011– African Union of Broadcasting & SuperSport

Somalia
2019– beIN Media Group
2015– beIN Media Group
2011– Al Jazeera Sport

South Africa
2023– SABC, SuperSport
2011– African Union of Broadcasting & SuperSport

Sudan
2019– beIN Media Group
2015– beIN Media Group
2011– Al Jazeera Sport

Swaziland
2011– African Union of Broadcasting & SuperSport

Tanzania
2011– African Union of Broadcasting & SuperSport

Togo
2023– New World TV
2011– African Union of Broadcasting & SuperSport

Tunisia
2023– beIN Media Group
2019– beIN Media Group
2015– beIN Media Group
2011– Al Jazeera Sport & Eurosport

Uganda
2011– African Union of Broadcasting & SuperSport

Zambia
2023– ZNBC
2019– SuperSport
2011– African Union of Broadcasting & SuperSport

Zanzibar
2011– African Union of Broadcasting & SuperSport

Zimbabwe
2011– African Union of Broadcasting & SuperSport

Asia

Afghanistan
2023– ATN
2019– ATN

Bahrain
2023– beIN Media Group
2019– beIN Media Group
2015– beIN Media Group
2011– Al Jazeera Sport

Bangladesh
2023– T Sports
2015– Multi Screen Media

Bhutan
2015– Multi Screen Media

Brunei
2023– Kristal-Astro
2019– MEASAT Satellite Systems
2015– MEASAT Satellite Systems
2011– MEASAT Satellite Systems

Cambodia
2023– TVK
2011– CBS Cambodia

Hong Kong
2011– I-CABLE

India
2023– Viacom 18
2015– Multi Screen Media

Indonesia
2023– MNC Media
2015– PT Inter-Sports Marketing
2011– M-League

Iran
2023– beIN Media Group
2019– beIN Media Group
2015– beIN Media Group
2011– Al Jazeera Sport

Iraq
2023– beIN Media Group
2019– beIN Media Group
2015– beIN Media Group
2011– Al Jazeera Sport

Japan
2023– NHK, Fuji TV, J Sports Corporation & TV Asahi
2019– NHK, Fuji TV, & J Sports Corporation
2015– NHK, Fuji TV, & J Sports Corporation
2011– NHK, Fuji TV, & J Sports Corporation

Jordan
2019– beIN Media Group
2015– beIN Media Group
2011– Al Jazeera Sport & Eurosport

North Korea
2023– SBS, KBS & MBC
2019– Seoul Broadcasting System
2015– Seoul Broadcasting System

Laos
2011– Asian Broadcast Union

Kuwait
2023– beIN Media Group
2019– beIN Media Group
2015– beIN Media Group
2011– Al Jazeera Sport

Lebanon
2023– beIN Media Group
2019– beIN Media Group
2015– beIN Media Group
2011– Al Jazeera Sport & Eurosport

Malaysia
2023– Astro, RTM & Unifi
2019– Astro
2015– Astro
2011– Astro

Maldives
2015– Multi Screen Media
2011– MediaNet

Mongolia
2023– Central Television

Myanmar
2023– Sky Net
2011– BecTero

Nepal
2023– Media Hub
2015– Multi Screen Media

Oman
2023– beIN Media Group
2019– beIN Media Group
2015– beIN Media Group
2011– Al Jazeera Sport

Pakistan
2023– ARY Digital Network
2015– Multi Screen Media

Palestine
2019– beIN Media Group
2015– beIN Media Group
2011– Al Jazeera Sport

People's Republic of China
2023– China Central Television & iQIYI
2019– China Central Television
2015– China Central Television
2011– China Central Television

Qatar
2023– beIN Media Group
2019– beIN Media Group
2015– beIN Media Group
2011– Al Jazeera Sport

Saudi Arabia
2023– beIN Media Group
2019– beIN Media Group
2015– beIN Media Group
2011– Al Jazeera Sport

Singapore
2011– StarHub TV

South Korea
2023– Seoul Broadcasting System, Korean Broadcasting System & Munhwa Broadcasting Corporation
2019– Seoul Broadcasting System
2015– Seoul Broadcasting System
2011– Seoul Broadcasting System (including SBS Sports; redistributed to Korea Broadcasting System including KBS N Sports and Munhwa Broadcasting Corporation including MBC Sports+)

Sri Lanka
2015– Multi Screen Media
2011– Asian Broadcast Union

Syria
2023– beIN Media Group
2019– beIN Media Group
2015– beIN Media Group
2011– Al Jazeera Sport & Eurosport

Taipei
2023– ELTA & CTS
2011– ELTA

Thailand
2023– PPTV HD36
2019– PPTV
2011– Admas World

Timor Leste
2023– ETO TELCO
2011– Asian Broadcast Union

United Arab Emirates
2023– beIN Media Group
2019– beIN Media Group
2015– beIN Media Group
2011– Al Jazeera Sport

Vietnam
2023– VTV
2011– Vietnam Football Media & VTV6

Yemen
2023– beIN Media Group
2019– beIN Media Group
2015– beIN Media Group
2011– Al Jazeera Sport

Oceania

Australia
2023 – Optus Sport and Seven Network
2019– SBS and Optus Sport
2011, 2015 – SBS

Cook Islands 
2015, 2019– SBS
2011– SBS & Mai TV

Federated State of Micronesia
2019– SBS
2015– SBS
2011– SBS & Mai TV

Fiji
2023– FBC TV
2019– SBS
2015– SBS
2011– SBS & Mai TV

French Polynesia
2019– Canal+

Kiribati
2019– SBS
2015– SBS
2011– SBS & Mai TV

Nauru
2019– SBS
2015– SBS
2011– SBS & Mai TV

New Caledonia
2019– Canal+

New Zealand
2023 – Sky Sport & Prime
2019– SBS & Sky
2015– SBS & Sky
2011– SBS & Sky

Niue
2019– SBS
2015– SBS
2011– SBS & Mai TV

Palau
2019– SBS
2015– SBS
2011– SBS & Mai TV

Papua New Guinea
2023– NBC TV
2019– SBS
2015– SBS
2011– SBS & Mai TV

Samoa
2019– SBS
2015– SBS
2011– SBS & Mai TV

Solomon Islands
2019– SBS
2015– SBS
2011– SBS & Mai TV

Tonga
2019– SBS
2015– SBS
2011– SBS & Mai TV

Tuvalu
2019– SBS
2015– SBS
2011– SBS & Mai TV

Vanuatu
2019– SBS
2015– SBS
2011– SBS & Mai TV

Wallis and Futuna
2019– Canal+

Europe

Albania
2023– Radiotelevisioni Shqiptar
2019– Radiotelevisioni Shqiptar
2015– European Broadcasting Union
2011– Eurosport & European Broadcasting Union

Andorra
2023– Canal+, M6 & TF1
2019– Canal+
2015– Eurosport & Metropole TV M6
2011– Eurosport & European Broadcasting Union

Armenia
2023– APMTV
2019– Public Television & Radio Armenia
2015– Eurosport & European Broadcasting Union
2011– Eurosport & European Broadcasting Union

Austria
2023– Oesterreichischer Rundfunk & ServusTV
2019– Oesterreichischer Rundfunk 
2015– European Broadcasting Union
2011– Eurosport & European Broadcasting Union

Azerbaijan
2023– Ictimai TV
2019– Ictimai
2015– Eurosport & European Broadcasting Union
2011– Eurosport & European Broadcasting Union

Belarus
2023– Belaruskaja Tele-Radio Companija
2019– Belaruskaja Tele-Radio Companija
2015– Eurosport & European Broadcasting Union
2011– Eurosport & European Broadcasting Union

Belgium
2023– RTBF & VRT
2019– Vlaamse Radio en Televisiemroep & Radio Télévision Belge de la Communauté Française
2015– Eurosport & European Broadcasting Union
2011– Eurosport & European Broadcasting Union

Bosnia-Herzegovina
2023– BHRT
2019– European Broadcasting Union
2015– European Broadcasting Union
2011– Eurosport & European Broadcasting Union

Bulgaria
2023– Balgarska Nationala Televizija & Nova
2019– Balgarska Nationala Televizija 
2015– Eurosport & European Broadcasting Union
2011– Eurosport & European Broadcasting Union

Channel Islands
2023– BBC
2019– BBC
2015– BBC

Croatia
2023– Hrvatska Radiotelevizija
2019– Hrvatska Radiotelevizija
2015– European Broadcasting Union
2011– Eurosport & European Broadcasting Union

Cyprus
2023– Cyprus Broadcasting Corporation
2019– Cyprus Broadcasting Corporation
2015– Eurosport & European Broadcasting Union

Czech Republic
2023– Ceska Televize & TV Nova
2019– Ceska Televize
2015– Eurosport & European Broadcasting Union
2011– Eurosport & European Broadcasting Union

Denmark
2023– DR & TV2 Denmark 
2019– TV2 Denmark
2015– TV2 Denmark
2011– Eurosport & Sveriges Television

Estonia
2023– Estonian Public Broadcasting
2019– Estonian Public Broadcasting
2015– Eurosport & European Broadcasting Union
2011– Eurosport & European Broadcasting Union

Faroe Islands
2023– Sveriges Television, DR & TV 2
2019– Sveriges Television & TV2 Denmark
2015– Sveriges Television
2011– Sveriges Television

Finland
2023– MTV3 & Yle
2019– Yleisradio OY
2015– Eurosport
2011– Eurosport & Sveriges Television

France
2023- La 1ère, TF1, Canal+ & M6
2019- TF1, France 2, France 3 & Canal+
2015–  W9 & Eurosport
2011– Direct 8 & Eurosport

Georgia
2023– Georgian Public Broadcasting
2019– European Broadcasting Union
2015– Eurosport & European Broadcasting Union
2011– Eurosport & European Broadcasting Union

Germany
2023– ARD/ZDF
2019– ARD/ZDF
2015– Eurosport & ARD/ZDF
2011– Eurosport & ARD/ZDF

Greece
2023- ANTENNA GROUP (ANT1 and ANT1+)
2019– European Broadcasting Union
2015– Eurosport
2011– Eurosport & European Broadcasting Union

Greenland
2023– SVT, TV4, DR & TV2 Denmark
2019– SVT & TV2 Denmark
2015– SVT & TV2 Denmark

Hungary
2023– Magyar Televizo
2019– Maygar Televizo
2015– Eurosport & European Broadcasting Union
2011– Eurosport & European Broadcasting Union

Iceland
2023– Icelandic National Broadcasting Service
2019– Icelandic National Broadcasting Service
2015– Eurosport & European Broadcasting Union
2011– Eurosport & European Broadcasting Union

Ireland
2023– RTÉ & TG4
2019– RTÉ & TG4
2015– Eurosport & European Broadcasting Union
2011– Eurosport & European Broadcasting Union

Isle of Man
2023– BBC
2019– BBC
2015– BBC
2011– BBC

Israel
2023– IPBC & Sport 5
2019– IPBC
2015– Eurosport & European Broadcasting Union
2011– Eurosport & European Broadcasting Union

Italy
2023– RAI & Sky Sport
2019– RAI & Sky Sport
2015– Eurosport
2011– Eurosport

Kazakhstan
2023– Jibek Joly TV
2019– European Broadcasting Union
2015– European Broadcasting Union
2011– European Broadcasting Union

Kosovo
2023– RTK
2019– European Broadcasting Union
2015– Eurosport & European Broadcasting Union
2011– European Broadcasting Union

Latvia
2023– Latvijas Televizija
2019– Latvijas Televizija 
2015– Eurosport & European Broadcasting Union
2011– Eurosport & European Broadcasting Union

Liechtenstein
2023– SRG SSR
2019– SRG SSR
2015– Eurosport & European Broadcasting Union
2011– Eurosport & European Broadcasting Union

Lithuania
2023– Lietuvos Radijas Ir Televizija
2019– Lietuvos Radijas Ir Televizija
2015– Eurosport & European Broadcasting Union
2011– Eurosport & European Broadcasting Union

Luxembourg
2015– Eurosport & European Broadcasting Union
2011– Eurosport & European Broadcasting Union

Malta
2023– Public Broadcasting Services Ltd.
2019– Public Broadcasting Services Ltd. 
2015– Eurosport & European Broadcasting Union
2011– Eurosport & European Broadcasting Union

Moldova
2023– TRM
2019– European Broadcasting Union
2015– Eurosport & European Broadcasting Union
2011– Eurosport & European Broadcasting Union

Monaco
2023– TF1
2019– Canal+
2015– Eurosport & Metropole 6
2011– Eurosport & Télévision Française 1

Montenegro
2019– Radiotelevizija Crne Gore 
2015– European Broadcasting Union
2011– European Broadcasting Union

Netherlands
2023– Nederlandse Omroep Stichting
2019– Nederlandse Omroep Stichting
2015– Eurosport & European Broadcasting Union
2011– Eurosport & European Broadcasting Union

North Macedonia
2023– Macedonian Radio and Television
2019– Macedonian Radio and Television
2015– European Broadcasting Union

Norway
2023– TV2, & Norwegian Broadcasting Corporation
2019– TV2, & Norwegian Broadcasting Corporation
2015– Eurosport, TV2, & Norwegian Broadcasting Corporation
2011– Eurosport & European Broadcasting Union

Poland
2023- Viaplay
2019–  Telewizja Polska SA 
2015– European Broadcasting Union
2011– Eurosport & European Broadcasting Union

Portugal
2023– RTP, SIC, Sport TV & TVI
2019– Rádio e Televisão de Portugal 
2015– Eurosport & European Broadcasting Union
2011– Eurosport & European Broadcasting Union

Romania
2023– Televiziunea Romana
2019– Televiziunea Romana
2015– European Broadcasting Union
2011– Eurosport & European Broadcasting Union

Russia
2015– Eurosport
2011– Eurosport & European Broadcasting Union

San Marino
2023– Radiotelevisione Italiana * Sky Sport
2019– Radiotelevisione Italiana * SKY Italia
2015– Eurosport
2011– Eurosport

Serbia
2023– Radiotelevizija Srbije
2019– Radiotelevizija Srbije 
2015– Eurosport & European Broadcasting Union
2011– Eurosport & European Broadcasting Union

Slovakia
2023– Radio and Television Slovakia
2019– Radio and Television Slovakia
2015– Eurosport & European Broadcasting Union
2011– Eurosport & European Broadcasting Union

Slovenia
2023– Radiotelevizija Slovenija
2019– Radiotelevizija Slovenija 
2015– Eurosport & European Broadcasting Union
2011– Eurosport & European Broadcasting Union

Spain
2023– RTVE
2019– RTVE
2015– Eurosport
2011– Eurosport

Sweden
2023– Sveriges Television & TV4
2019– TV4
2015– Eurosport & TV4
2011– Eurosport & Sveriges Television

Switzerland
2023– SRG SSR
2019– SRG SSR
2015– Eurosport & European Broadcasting Union
2011– Eurosport & European Broadcasting Union

Turkey
2023– Turkiye Radyo-Televizyon Kurumu
2019– Turkiye Radyo-Televizyon Kurumu 
2015– Eurosport & European Broadcasting Union
2011– Eurosport & European Broadcasting Union

Ukraine
2023– Public Broadcasting Company of Ukraine & MEGOGO
2019– Public Broadcasting Company of Ukraine 
2015– Eurosport
2011– Eurosport & European Broadcasting Union

Vatican City
2023– RAI & Sky Sport
2019– RAI & Sky Sport
2015– Eurosport
2011– Eurosport

United Kingdom
2023– BBC
2019– BBC
2015– Eurosport & BBC

North America

Canada

English-language television

2023– CTV & TSN
2019– CTV & TSN
2015– CTV & TSN
2011– CBC & Sportsnet

Notes

CTV and TSN used their own announcers for all Canadian games during the 2015 FIFA Women's World Cup, and U.S. matches from the round of 16 onward. For all other matches they used the English World Feed.

French-language television

Mexico
2023– Televisa, TV Azteca & Sky
2019– Televisa
2015– Televisa
2011– Televisa & TV Azteca

United States

English-language television

Finals

Other rounds

Notes
ESPN broadcast all matches for the 1999 Women's World Cup, but ESPN cut it back from 32 to 18 for 2003 due to conflicts with college football and the NFL.
1999 featured the highest rated Women's Soccer match with the US/ China match until 2015. 11.4% of the nation's televisions tuned into the match.
2007 was the first Women's World Cup streamed online. All 32 matches were streamed on the fairly new ESPN 360, but games were not archived. 2007 is also the only year games were produced in studio. ESPN produced all the opening round matches in studio and didn't send their own broadcast team to China until the quarterfinals.
2011 became the first Women's World Cup to have games archived on ESPN3.
2015 became the first Women's World Cup to have the English World Feed available in the US. Fox used the English World Feed for their archive on the FOX Sports 2Go. 2015 also streamed games on the FOX Sports Go.
The USA/Japan 2015 Final became the highest ever rated soccer match in the US. 84.1% of the nation tuned into the match on Fox. An average 25.4 million viewers watched the entire match, with 30.9 viewers catching the final 15 minutes of the match. Spanish network Telemundo, drew another 1.27 million viewers to boost the overall viewership to 26.7 million.

Spanish-language television

English World Feed

South/Central America and American Island Nations

America Samoa
2019– Fox & Telemundo
2015– Fox & Telemundo
2011– ESPN & ESPN2

Anguilla
2019– DirecTV Sports
2015– DirecTV Sports

Antigua and Barbuda
2019– DirecTV Sports
2015– DirecTV Sports

Argentina
2023- TVP, TyC Sports & DIRECTV Sports
2019- TyC Sports & DIRECTV Sports
2015– TyC Sports & DIRECTV Sports
2011– TyC Sports & DirecTV Sports
2003- TyC Sports 
1999- TyC Sports

Aruba
2023– Telearuba 13
2019– DirecTV Sports

Bahamas
2023– SportsMax
2019– DirecTV Sports
2015– DirecTV Sports

Barbados
2019– DirecTV Sports
2015– DirecTV Sports

Belize
2019– DirecTV Sports
2015– DirecTV Sports

Bermuda
2019– DirecTV Sports
2015– DirecTV Sports

Bolivia
2023– BTV, Unitel & Red Uno
2019– Bolivisión, Bein Sports & DirecTV Sports
2015- Bolivisión, Tigo Sports, Bein Sports & DirecTV Sports
2011- Bein Sports & DirecTV Sports
2007- TVP, Red UNO, Bolivisión, Canal 11 & Sportmania
2003- TVP, Canal 11, Red UNO, TVP, Bolivisión, Multivisión & Supercanal 
1999- BT

Brazil

 1995 & 1999 - Organización de Televisión Iberoamericana. Rede Bandeirantes is a current member. Rede Globo and SporTV are former members.

British Virgin Islands
2019– DirecTV Sports
2015– DirecTV Sports

Cayman Islands
2023– Logic
2019– DirecTV Sports
2015– DirecTV Sports

Chile
2023- Chilevisión & Canal 13
2019- Chilevisión, Bein Sports & DirecTV Sports 
2015– Chilevisión, CDF & DirecTV Sports
2011– Bein Sports & DirecTV Sports
2007- La Red, Mega, Chilevisión, Canal 13 & Canal del Fútbol 
2003- TVN, Canal 13, Mega, La Red, Chilevisión, Metrópolis Intercom & VTR 
1999- SKY

Colombia
2023– Caracol TV, RCN TV, & DirecTV Sports
2019– Caracol TV, RCN TV, & DirecTV Sports
2015– Caracol TV, RCN TV, & DirecTV Sports
2011– Caracol TV, RCN TV, & DirecTV Sports

Costa Rica
2023– Teletica & Repretel
2019– Teletica
2015– Teletica
2011–Teletica

Curacao
2023– TV Direc 13
2019– DirecTV Sports
2015– DirecTV Sports

Dominica
2019– DirecTV Sports
2015– DirecTV Sports

Dominican Republic
2023– CDN 37
2019– DirecTV Sports
2015– DirecTV Sports

Ecuador
2023– Teleamazonas
2019– CNT Sports, DirecTV Sports & RTS
2015– CNT & DirecTV Sports
2011– DirecTV Sports, Ecuador TV

El Salvador
2023– Canales 2, 4, 6
2019– Canales 2, 4, 6
2015– DirecTV Sports

Grenada
2019– DirecTV Sports
2015– DirecTV Sports

Guadeloupe
2019– Canal+

Guam
2011– ESPN & ESPN2

Guatemala
2023– Tv Azteca Guatemala, Tigo Sports
2019– Televisa
2015– DirecTV Sports

Guyana
2019– DirecTV Sports
2015– DirecTV Sports

Haiti
2019– DirecTV Sports
2015– DirecTV Sports

Honduras
2023– Canal 5
2019– Canal 5
2015– DirecTV Sports

Jamaica
2023– TVJ
2019– DirecTV Sports
2015– DirecTV Sports

Martinique
2019– Canal+

Montserrat
2023– SportsMax
2019– DirecTV Sports
2015– DirecTV Sports

Nicaragua
2023– Canal 2 & Canal 10
2019– Canal 2 & Canal 10
2015– DirecTV Sports

Panama
2023– Canal 4 & TVN
2019– Canal 4 & TVN
2015– DirecTV Sports

Paraguay
2023– DirecTV Sports, SNT, Telefuturo, Trece & Tigo Sports
2019– DirecTV Sports
2015- Teledeportes & DirecTV Sports
2011- Unicanal, Ocho TV, Lobo TV & DirecTV Sports
2007- Teledeportes
2003- Teledeportes
1999- TyC

Peru
2023– Latina Television & DirecTV Sports
2019– Latina Television& DirecTV Sports

Puerto Rico
2023– Fox & Telemundo
2019– Fox & Telemundo
2015– Fox & Telemundo
2011– ESPN & ESPN2

St. Kitts and Nevis
2019– DirecTV Sports
2015– DirecTV Sports

St. Lucia
2019– DirecTV Sports
2015– DirecTV Sports

St. Vincent
2019– DirecTV Sports
2015– DirecTV Sports

Suriname
2023– SCCN TV
2019– DirecTV Sports
2015– DirecTV Sports

Trinidad and Tobago
2023– CNC3
2019– DirecTV Sports
2015– DirecTV Sports

Turks and Caicos Islands
2019– DirecTV Sports
2015– DirecTV Sports

Uruguay
2023- Canal 4, Canal 10, Teledoce & TyC Sports
2019- DirecTV Sports
2015– Tenfield & DirecTV Sports
2011– , Nueve TV, Lobo TV & DirecTV Sports
2007- Tenfield 
2003- Tenfield 
1999- TyC

US Virgin Islands
2019– DirecTV Sports
2015– DirecTV Sports
2011– ESPN, & ESPN2

Venezuela
2023- Televen
2019- DirecTV
2015– DirecTV
2011– Meridiano Televisión, DirecTV

References

Association football on television
Lists of association football broadcasters
ABC Sports
BBC Sport
NBC Deportes
ESPN announcers
ESPN2
Fox Sports
Fox Sports 1
SportsChannel
Sportsnet
FIFA Women's World Cup-related lists